Prancer Returns is a 2001 film and a direct-to-video sequel to the 1989 film Prancer.

Alecia Elliott recorded the theme song "If You Believe" for the movie and soundtrack.

Plot

Preteen siblings from a broken marriage live with their mother, Denise, in Three Oaks, Michigan. Ryan, the oldest, wants to go live with their father in Chicago. This confuses shy Charlie, the youngest, who is also the butt of bigger school kids' often mean pranks. Then he finds a reindeer on his way home from school, which he believes to be Prancer's son, also called Prancer, which he tries to hide at home. Ryan's help bonds him and Charlie again. Alas, when Prancer gets out, evil vice principal James is bitten and wants him put down. Charlie runs away with his protégé. Denise struggles, but her brother’s old friend, handyman Tom, comes to Charlie's rescue.

Cast
 John Corbett as Tom Sullivan
 Stacy Edwards as Denise Holton
 Michael O'Keefe as James Klock
 Jack Palance as Old Man Richards
 Robert Clark as Ryan Holton
 Gavin Fink as Charlie Holton
 Hayley Lochner as Jamie
 Jonathan Malen as Scott
 Richard Banel as Horace
 J.C. Kenny as Charlotte Purcell
 Reg Dreger as Three Oaks' Mayor
 Doe as Prancer
 Darren T. Knaus as Prancer (voice) (uncredited)

Reception
On Rotten Tomatoes, the film has 2 reviews listed, both are positive.

References

External links
 
 

2001 direct-to-video films
2001 films
2000s Christmas drama films
Direct-to-video sequel films
American Christmas drama films
American fantasy drama films
Canadian Christmas films
Canadian fantasy drama films
Films directed by Joshua Butler
Films set in Michigan
Universal Pictures direct-to-video films
2001 directorial debut films
2000s English-language films
2000s American films
2000s Canadian films